The Béthune is a river of Normandy, France,  in length, flowing through the department of Seine-Maritime and it is a tributary of the Arques. However, Sandre, the regulators of France's  national Water Information System, consider the Béthune to be the upper part of the Arques.

Geography 

The river's source is at the village of Gaillefontaine near to Forges-les-Eaux. Its valley is wholly within the pays de Bray. Its course takes it past the communes of Neufchâtel-en-Bray, Mesnières-en-Bray, Bures-en-Bray, Osmoy-Saint-Valery, Saint-Vaast-d'Équiqueville, Dampierre-Saint-Nicolas, Saint-Aubin-le-Cauf and finally Arques-la-Bataille where it joins the rivers Eaulne and Varenne to form the Arques.

Like other rivers in the region, the Béthune is classified as a first class river, offering anglers the chance to catch salmon and trout.

See also 
French water management scheme

References

Rivers of France
Rivers of Normandy
Rivers of Seine-Maritime